St. Andrew's Kirk is one of the oldest buildings in Georgetown, Guyana that has been continually in use for religious purposes. The Dutch Reformed congregation laid its foundations in 1811. However, due to financial difficulties it was acquired by Scottish Presbyterians and was formally opened for service on 28 February 1818.

It was the first church in Guyana built by Europeans in which slaves were allowed to worship. It is situated near the Parliament Building on the north eastern corner of Brickdam. During its bicentennial in 2018, then President David A. Granger remarked that the church was a "social microscope", as a monument to the city's colonial Dutch and British heritage, the first church to open its doors to enslaved Africans, and also as barracks for the Provisional Battalion deployed for suppressing the Demerara rebellion of 1823. A historic service was held to mark Emancipation on 1 August 1838, which was attended by then Governor Sir Henry Light and many Afro-Guyanese. The church established a school in 1841 and hosted public concerts and recitals.

Leadership 
Rev. Oswald Allen Best was the first Guyanese minister serving from 1974 until his death in April, 2009. In September 2011, Reverend Maureen Massiah, was appointed. Massiah is the first female Minister elevated to the full status of Ordained Minister.

See also 

 St. George's Cathedral, Georgetown
 Religion in Guyana

References

Churches in Guyana
Churches completed in 1818
Dutch Reformed Church buildings
Presbyterian churches in South America
Scottish diaspora
Buildings and structures in Georgetown, Guyana